Lacey Green is a village and civil parish in the Buckinghamshire district, near Princes Risborough, in the ceremonial county of Buckinghamshire, England. It is in the Chiltern Hills above the town.

It was home to Heston Blumenthal, whose parents used to own amusement arcades in the area.

RAF Bomber Command commandeered some agricultural land for an airfield during World War II. The land has now reverted to agriculture, the school playing field and the village sports ground.

The village has lost its Methodist chapel, shop and sub-post office but still retains a sports club, primary school, two pubs (three if you include The Pink and Lily at Parslow's Hillock), Village Hall and the windmill.

The hamlet was known as Leasy Green in the early 19th century.  It is twinned with Hambye in France.

Dated to 1650 by leading authority Stanley Freese, Lacey Green windmill is the oldest surviving smock mill in England  and was restored from a state of almost total collapse by volunteers under the auspices of the Chiltern Society. Though it is widely believed that the mill was originally sited in nearby Chesham and moved to Lacey Green in 1821, no primary sources have been found to substantiate this and the Chiltern Society has been unable to trace the story beyond 1932  A somewhat speculative theory to perhaps explain the story's origin has been advanced by Michael Highfield, author of the Chiltern Society's guide to the mill. He recounts a conversation with a 96-year-old lady who had lived in the area all her life and remembered being chased away from "Cheshums Mill" as a child. The Mill had been in the Cheshire family since the 1860s and was sometimes referred to locally as Cheshire's mill, applying the Buckinghamshire dialect possessive suffix 'ums', Cheshire's becomes Cheshums!

Hamlets 
Hamlets within the parish of Lacey Green include Loosley Row, Speen, Wardrobes and Parslow's Hillock.

References

External links
Walks near, and general details of, Lacey Green
Details of the windmill
Lacey Green Windmill

Villages in Buckinghamshire
Civil parishes in Buckinghamshire